Joseph Laryea (born 21 May 1965) is a Ghanaian former professional boxer who competed from 1993 to 2001. As an amateur, he competed in the men's middleweight event at the 1992 Summer Olympics.

References

External links
 
 

1965 births
Living people
Ghanaian male boxers
Olympic boxers of Ghana
Boxers at the 1992 Summer Olympics
Commonwealth Games medallists in boxing
Commonwealth Games silver medallists for Ghana
Boxers at the 1990 Commonwealth Games
Boxers from Accra
Middleweight boxers
20th-century Ghanaian people
Medallists at the 1990 Commonwealth Games